This is a list of Allsvenskan stadiums.

Stadiums
Stadiums listed in blue indicate that they are the home grounds of teams currently participating in the 2018 Allsvenskan season, while the stadiums listed in red have now been demolished.

† For closed or demolished grounds, capacity is taken at closure.
‡ Currently in the process of, or scheduled to be developed.

See also
Record home attendances of Swedish football clubs

References

 
Sweden, Allsvenskan